Stephen "Max" James Sandvoss (born Stephen James Sandvoss) (stage name: Steve Sandvoss) is an American farmer and former actor.

Early life and current career
Sandvoss was born in New York City, New York. His mother, Joyce, is American-born, and his father, Rolf Herman George Sandvoss, was Swiss-born.

After attending school in the suburbs of New York City, and in Connecticut, Sandvoss studied Chinese, thinking about going into international business, but changed his studies to poetry and prose writing, graduating cum laude from Harvard in 2002.

After working as a film and television actor from 2003 to 2010, Sandvoss founded a dairy and creamery in East Bethany, New York, with his brother Trystan Sandvoss. Since January 2018, he has held the position of National Sales & Marketing Director at "Old Chatham Sheepherding Co.".  Another brother, Peter, continues to work in film production.

Acting career
Sandvoss’ break as an actor came in 2003 when he landed the role of a football star competing against Will Estes in the NBC drama series American Dreams and as the main character in the independent film Latter Days in the same year.

Theater
Tape (2004) with West Liang and Elizabeth Kell; Ivar Brick Box Theater, Hollywood.

Television
His other television roles include appearances on Dr. Vegas, Nip/Tuck, The Inside, Cold Case, E-Ring, Grey's Anatomy, and Miami Medical.

Television appearances
American Dreams (2003) (Episode 1.24)
Dr. Vegas (2004) (Episode 1.1)
Nip/Tuck (2005) (Episode 3.08)
The Inside (2005) (Episodes 1.11, 1.12, 1.13, aired in UK after being cancelled in U.S.A.)
Cold Case (2005) (Episode 2.18)
E-Ring (2006) (Episode 1.21 aired in UK after being cancelled in the U.S.A.)
Grey's Anatomy (2007) (Episode 4.06)
Revolution (Sci-Fi channel pilot) (2009)
Miami Medical (2010) (Episode 1.01)

Film
Sandvoss made his feature-film debut in the 2003 independent film Latter Days. His second feature film was 2005's Rumor Has It…, starring Jennifer Aniston, Kevin Costner, Mark Ruffalo and Shirley MacLaine.

Sandvoss was cast in the short film Waning Moon, directed by Luca Colombo, which debuted in August 2006 at a Swiss Film Festival in Lugano.

In June 2006, Sandvoss began filming the horror film Buried Alive, in the role of Danny. The film was released on DVD in October 2007. In late 2006, it was announced that he would reunite with director/writer C. Jay Cox in a supporting role in the film Kiss the Bride, released in 2008.

In May 2007, Sandvoss took on the role of Mason Michael Finch in the indie film Fling (formerly titled Lie to Me), filmed on location in Kansas City, Missouri. The film had its premiere on 26 April 2008, at the Newport Beach Film Festival during the same time frame that Sandvoss was filming a pilot for the Sci-Fi channel, titled "Revolution". It was announced in November 2008 that he would appear in the independent film Exquisite Corpse.

Film credits
 Latter Days (2003)
 Rumor Has It… (2005)
 Waning Moon (Short) (2006)
 Price To Pay (2006) Remains unreleased
 Buried Alive (2007)
 Kiss The Bride (2007)
 Fling (2008)
 Exquisite Corpse (2010)

References

External links
 
 
 
 
 Old Chatham Creamery

1980 births
Living people
American male film actors
American male television actors
Male actors from New York City
Harvard University alumni